Fengquan District is a district of the city of Xinxiang, Henan province, China.

Administrative divisions
As 2012, this district is divided to 2 subdistricts, 1 town and 2 townships.
Subdistricts
Baoxi Subdistrict
Baodong Subdistrict

Towns
Dakuai

Townships
Luwangfen Township
Genghuang Township

References

County-level divisions of Henan
Xinxiang